The 1987 Marshall Thundering Herd football team represented Marshall University as a member of the Southern Conference (SoCon) during the 1987 NCAA Division I-AA football season. Led by second-year head coach George Chaump, the Thundering Herd compiled an overall record of 10–5 with a mark of 4–2 in conference play, placing second in the SoCon. Marshall advanced to the NCAA Division I-AA Football Championship playoffs for the first time in program history, beating James Madison in the first round, Weber State in the quarterfinals, and SoCon champion Appalachian State in the semifinals before losing to Northeast Louisiana in the NCAA Division I-AA Championship Game.

The team played their home games at Fairfield Stadium in Huntington, West Virginia.

Schedule

References

Marshall
Marshall Thundering Herd football seasons
Marshall Thundering Herd football